Bayani is a Philippine educational television series produced by ABS-CBN in cooperation with the Philippine Department of Education, Culture and Sports (DECS).

The show revolves around two Grade 4 to 6 school children who discovers a cave where they meet an old man who tasks them to go back in time to relive certain events to witness the heroism of select figures in Philippine history.

During its original run, the show airs every weekends (formerly Wednesday) on ABS-CBN from 1995 to 2002.

The Department of Education has endorsed Bayani, together with the other educational television shows developed by ABS-CBN Foundation (formerly ABS-CBN Lingkod Kapamilya Foundation), as part of regular class activities.

Background
Bayani dramatizes historical events and the lives of Filipino historical heroes as well as their accomplishments from the perspective of two elementary/middle school students named Noli and Aya/Ana and later replaced by Manuel and Lisa, who magically travel back in time to retrieve historical items for an old person. Their travels enable them to meet famous Filipino heroes including José Rizal, Andres Bonifacio, Apolinario Mabini, Emilio Jacinto, Melchora Aquino, Antonio Luna, Diego Silang and his wife, Gabriela Silang, Teresa Magbanua, Josefa Llanes Escoda, Gomburza, Graciano Lopez Jaena, Gregorio del Pilar, Hermano Pule, Marcelo H. Del Pilar, Lapulapu, Macario Sakay, Datu Ali, Jose Abad Santos amongst others.

The series also delved into the lives of leading lights in Philippine arts and literature, including Aurelio Tolentino, Francisco Balagtas, Juan Luna, Jose Corazon de Jesus, Atang de la Rama, Nicanor Abelardo and Francisca Reyes-Aquino. In comparison to other educational series, the show discussed the important contributions of contemporary heroes primarily on various aspects of civics education including Ermin Garcia on the freedom of the press, Sajid Bulig on the importance of the youth, Roselle Ambubuyog on the rights of persons with disabilities, Rhona Mahilum on the importance of family and Fely Tatlonghari on the voting rights. The series also placed importance on the heroes and martyrs of the Marcos' martial law regime particularly on the episodes on Ditto Sarmiento, Remberto "Bobby" de la Paz, and Macli-ing Dulag. It has also featured several episodes on the collective heroism of people, including the Battle of Balangiga, the Mutiny of the Tayabas Regiment, the Women of Malolos, the Philex miners during the 1990 Luzon earthquake, the 1991 eruption of Mount Pinatubo and the 1986 People Power Revolution that ousted the dictator Ferdinand Marcos.

Main setting 
The first episode of the show had Noli and Aya hiding in a cave in the mountains while fleeing from a gang of bullies. In the cave, an elderly man (Rolando Tinio) meets them and presents himself as the guardian of the cave which holds the memories of Philippine history and the spirit of the country. He then reveals that Noli and Ana were destined to discover the mysterious cave and are chosen ones of pure heart to access a heavy book known as "Aklat ng Kasaysayan" (Book of History). The Guardian then sends them on a magical adventure through time to retrieve various lost and stolen historical items from different time periods. At the end of each travel, the two schoolchildren return with the artifacts and presents them to the guardian, who later becomes a grandfather figure to the children.

Throughout the series, the main setting for the beginning and ending of each episodes is a cave and elderly person is a male. An elderly woman appeared in the next few episodes and also becomes a grandmother figure to the children. After Tinio's death in 1997, the elderly woman becomes a mainstay guardian to the children who regularly visit the cave and also becomes the cave's secret holder, while retaining the Book of History.

In the later episodes, the cave setting has been changed to a different setting although the Book of History is still retained including several episodes filmed inside the Museo Pambata. The Rhona Mahilum episode is an example of this change; the show begins in a forest where Noli and Ana camp, while the adult guardian is an aunt of theirs and the ending is set in the hospital where the episode's title character is admitted.

Cast

Original characters
 Angelo Cometa as Noli - the male lead of the series. Cometa played the character which was later cut off or written out of the series after he outgrew his role and aged out of middle school age.
Celine Lirio as Aya - Noli's friend and female lead of the series until episode 23. Like Noli, Aya was cut off after her actress outgrew the middle school age.
 Various actresses as Ana - Noli's friend and female lead of the series. The character first appeared in episode 24, serving as a replacement to Aya and was also cut off along with Noli after the character's actors outgrew the middle school age. Ana was played by some actresses which include Mara Babor, Marjorie Enumerable, and Agatha Tapan. 
Rolando Tinio as Lolo - the first and original  guardian of the cave who later becomes a grandfather figure to the children and shown on the series until episode 11. Tinio later died on July 7, 1997.
Various actresses as Lola - the hermit guardian and keeper of the cave that who later becomes a grandmother figure to the children. She was portrayed by the following actresses: 
 Ella Luansing Tinio - succeeded the role upon the death of Rolando Tinio, her real-life spouse.
 Ermie Concepcion - the first replacement actress on the character upon the sudden demise of Rolando Tino and shown from episode 24 and 25.
 Leticia Tizon - serves as the guardian and keeper of the cave; another temporary replacement of the character upon the sudden death of Tinio. She appears from episode 13 to 23.
 Ama Quiambao as Lola - same role as the grandmother character in the series; another temporary replacement of the character in a short period of time upon the death of Tinio. 
 Caridad Sanchez as Lola - the female secret keeper of the cave and a grandmother figure to the children from episode 26 until episode 71.

New characters
 Malou de Guzman as Tita - the aunt of Ana and Noli and appear at episode 72.
 BJ Rodriguez as Manuel - the new male lead of the series who replaced Noli (after he was deemed outgrown of elementary school age) and is first introduced in the "Fely Tatlonghari" episode.
 Claudine Alejandro as Lisa - Manuel's friend and the new female lead of the series in "Fely Tatlonghari" episode. She replaced Ana, one of the main character of the series.

Production
Bayani was produced by a Creative Committee composed of an executive producer, head writer, scriptwriter, and consultants from the Department of Education, Culture and Sports (DECS, later became the Department of Education or DepEd), and history experts from the University of the Philippines Diliman. It was meant towards children 7 to 12 years of age. Producers seek to promote the value of heroism, promote the formation of the viewers' Filipino identity, as well as foster awareness regarding the implication of events, actions of people, and promotion of a certain viewpoint to history at large.

Like in Hiraya Manawari and Sine'skwela, the Creative Committee of Bayani discuss among themselves which historical hero would they feature in an episode at what heroism did they exhibit. A script for an episode will then be made and it will be vetted by a consultant from UP if the script is faithful to historical facts and records. Further changes will be made until it is approved by the whole committee. Cielo Reyes and Carina Villanoz are the executive producers of Bayani.

Reruns
Reruns of the show is currently aired on ABS-CBN owned educational channel Knowledge Channel from the channel's launch in 1999.

From March 28, 2020, the show's episodes were rerun on ABS-CBN as part of the programming change the network made due to the COVID-19 pandemic in the Philippines. This rerun was abruptly cut due to the temporary closure of ABS-CBN following the cease and desist order issued by the National Telecommunications Commission on account of its franchise expiration, and then returned on the Kapamilya Channel when the channel launched on June 13, 2020.

All of its episodes can also be watched in the iWant app that is available in the Philippines.

References

1995 Philippine television series debuts
2002 Philippine television series endings
1990s Philippine television series
ABS-CBN original programming
Children's education television series
Cultural depictions of Andrés Bonifacio
Cultural depictions of Apolinario Mabini
Cultural depictions of Filipino men
Cultural depictions of José Rizal
Filipino-language television shows
Historical television series
Philippine children's television series
Philippine educational television series
1990s time travel television series
2000s time travel television series
Time travel devices
Philippine science fiction television series